Moosberg is a low hill in Hesse, Germany.

Hills of Hesse
Reinhardswald